Pavel Nešleha (19 February 1937, Prague – 13 September 2003, Prague) was a Czech painter, illustrator, graphic artist, and photographer. He was a prominent representative of the 1960s art movement and a major figure in Czech non-conformist avant-garde art. His drawings and graphical work earned him several awards and distinctions. Starting in 1965, his work was showcased regularly in group expositions in Czechoslovakia and abroad; he had his first solo show in 1966.

Life 

After attending art school in Prague for four years (1952–56), Nešleha studied at the Academy of Arts, Architecture and Design in Prague in the studio of monumental and applied painting headed by Professor Alois Fišárek (1956–62). His diploma work, an abstract painting that he had designed for the Concert Hall in Hradec Králové, was banned and destroyed because it was judged ideologically objectionable by the communist state. To complete his degree, Nešleha then used a collection of expressionist paintings that he had made in the course of his studies; he received a school prize for this work. In 1960 he joined a group of avant-garde artists in Prague called "Confrontations I and II". Through the activities of this group, he met graphic artist Vladimír Boudník and became friends with theoreticians František Šmejkal and Jan Kříž. His career was interrupted for two years by compulsory military service (1962–64). In 1966 he became involved in the activities of theoretician and art critic Jindřich Chalupecký. In the spring of 1968 the French Government awarded him a scholarship to spend three months in Paris; he took this opportunity to visit various museums and monuments in France. He married Mahulena Hromádkova (now , an art historian) later that year; their daughter Johanna G. Nešlehová, a statistician, was born in 1977.

In 1970 Nešleha was offered a position as Professor of Drawing at the Academy of Fine Arts in Kassel, Germany; he had to decline, however, because the Czechoslovak state denied him the right to leave the country. Throughout the normalization period (1970–1989), he was a member of Jindřich Chalupecký's circle. In 1987 he participated in the foundation of the group Zaostalí (The Odd Ones) with painters Bedřich Dlouhý and Zdeněk Beran, sculptor Hugo Demartini, architect Karel Kouba, and composer Jan Klusák. In 1990 he received a grant from the Pollock-Krasner Foundation. In the same year, he became head of the studio of painting at the Academy of Arts, Architecture and Design in Prague, a position he held until 2002. He was appointed full professor in 1991 and also served as vice-rector. He became a member of the Mánes Union of Fine Arts in 1995. He died of cancer in September 2003.

Artwork 

Nešleha's work is rich in themes; it includes paintings, drawings, prints and photographs, as well as installations, collages, luminous objects and reliefs. His work from the late 1950s and 1960s is influenced by expressive and informel art currents in which work is guided by imagination. He depicts the drama of human existence in its various forms. In the mid 1960s, his work gradually becomes more figurative and eventually leads to paintings, graphic art and large-scale drawings that amplify detailed parts of the human body. Starting in 1968, he develops an interest in photography and explores the extent to which the objective depiction of reality can be influenced by an artistic viewpoint; in his work, objects from day-to-day life intersect with the grotesque, the ironic or the absurd. In the 1970s, he develops individualistic themes with surreal overtones; an interest in meditation and the symbolic value of light leads him to explore how light influences man's perception of objects and reliefs.

The 1980s bring a different trend to the artist's work. Influenced by the romantic views of K. H. Mácha and C. D. Friedrich, Nešleha explores the relationship between man and nature and the symbolic nature of light through various themes. His paintings highlight paradoxes by combining reality and illusion; he gives relief to his work using doors and various other objects, assembled and sometimes animated with video. His pastels, drawings, and photographs reflect some of the artist's leitmotifs: nature, myth, and fate. By the end of the 1990s, his attention turns once again to light, which is now endowed with spiritual significance — he uses light pastel to depict reality gradually disappearing in abstract colorful characters and visions. His creativity then comes to an end abruptly with his premature death in 2003.

Most prominent artwork

Paintings and objects 
Hlava III (Head III), 1969; oil, Heraklith woodwool slab, 91 x 66 cm. Zlatá Husa Gallery, Prague.
Rozloučení s C. D. Friedrichem (Parting with C. D. Friedrich), 1982; acrylic, oil, hardboard, 180 x 120 cm. Private collection.
Cesta (Journey), 1983; oil, acrylic, hardboard, 116 x 82 cm. National Gallery in Prague – Jiří Valoch Collection.
Minul čas (z projektu Iluze v soukromí) (The Time has Elapsed – from the cycle Illusions in Private), 1986; door object, acrylic, chipboard, 245 x 300 x 50 cm. Private collection.
Ani na zemi ani na nebi (Neither on the Earth, nor in the Sky), 1989; acrylic, wood, cardboard, 265 x 410 x 280 cm. National Gallery in Prague.

Drawings 
Dlaň (Palm), 1969–70; pencil, paper, wooden board, 106 x 80.5 cm. West Bohemian Gallery in Pilsen.
Z cyklu Židle (from the cycle Chairs), 1972; pencil, paper, 105 x 88 cm. Private collection.
Čas otevřených dveří VI (The Time of Open Doors VI), 1978; black chalk, paper, 49 x 70 cm. Private collection.
Oidipus III (Oedipus III), 1992; charcoal, black chalk, hardboard, 245 x 160 cm. North Bohemian Gallery of Fine Arts in Litoměřice.

Pastels 
Tajemství znaků (The Mystery of Signs), 1993; pastel, paper, 132 x 90 cm. Private collection.
Oidipus V (Oedipus V), 1993; pastel, paper, 90 x 132 cm. Private collection.
Proměna zobrazení (Transformation of Representation), 1997; pastel, hardboard, 244 x 304 cm. Private collection.
Z cyklu Záznamy světla (from the cycle Recordings of Lights), 2002–03; pastel, paper. Museum of Czech Literature.

Photographs 
Ďáblovy hlavy IV (ze série Pocta Václavu Levému) (The Devil's Heads IV – from the series Hommage to Václav Levý), 1977–2000; coloured photograph, 26.7 x 39.2 cm. Private collection.
Z cyklu Přírodní struktury I (from the cycle Natural Structures I), 2001; digital print, 140 x 205 cm. Private collection.
Z cyklu Přírodní struktury (from the cycle Natural Structures), 1973–2001; black and white photograph, 27 x 39 cm. Private collection.
Z cyklu Ojbín (from the cycle Oybin), 2000; black and white photograph, 39.3 x 26.4 cm. Private collection.

Art galleries 
Czech Republic: Represented in nearly all important public art collections, most notably at the following museums: National Gallery in Prague, Mikoláš Aleš South Bohemian Gallery in Hluboká, North Bohemian Gallery of Fine Arts in Litoměřice, Gallery of Modern Art in Roudnice nad Labem, Modern Gallery in Hradec Králové, Gallery of the Central Bohemian Region in Kutná Hora, Benedikt Rejt Gallery at Louny, the Museum of Czech Literature in Prague, and Terezín Memorial.
Croatia: Academy of Zagreb
France: Musée national d'art moderne – Centre Georges Pompidou, Paris; Musée d'art moderne de la Ville de Paris
Germany: Museum Bochum
Poland: Museum Sztuki, Łódž
Serbia: Muzej suvremene umjetnosti, Beograd
Slovenia: Moderna galerija Ljubljana
USA: Museum of Drawing and Graphic Art, Washington

References

Books 
Petr Wittlich: Pavel Nešleha, Gallery, Prague 2004 (and references therein). 
Zaostalí FOREVER, Petr Wittlich and Mahulena Nešlehová (Eds.), Gallery, Prague 2007. 
Dějiny českého výtvarného umění [VI/1,2] 1958/2000, Rostislav Švácha and Marie Platovská (Eds.), Academia, Prague 2007, pp. 193, 604–606, 653–655. 
Nová encyklopedie českého výtvarného umění (New Encyclopedia of Czech Fine Arts), Anděla Horová (Ed.), Academia, Prague 1995, pp. 564–565. 
Jindřich Chalupecký: Nové umění v Čechách (New Art in Bohemia), H&H, Prague 1994, pp. 72–73. 
Jan Kříž: Pavel Nešleha (exhibition catalog), Czech Museum of Fine Arts, Prague 1994.
Karin Thomas: Tradition und Avantgarde in Prag, Du Mont, Köln 1991, pp. 29–30. 
Victoria Thorson: Great Drawings of All Time – The Twentieth Century, Shorewood Fine Art Books, New York 1979.

External links 
Informační systém abART: Nešleha Pavel
Autor na artlist.cz
Dům Pánů z Kunštátu vystavuje fotografie symbolisty Nešlehy, Kristýna Chmelíková, September 10, 2008

1937 births
2003 deaths
Czech graphic designers
Photographers from Prague
20th-century Czech painters
Czech male painters
Artists from Prague
20th-century Czech male artists
Academy of Arts, Architecture and Design in Prague alumni
Academic staff of the Academy of Arts, Architecture and Design in Prague